Agasias was a Stymphalian of Arcadia who was frequently mentioned by Xenophon as a brave and active officer in the Army of the Ten Thousand. He was an acquaintance of both Hiero I of Syracuse and Xenophon. In his youth, he achieved an Olympic victory, and hired Pindar to compose a song of celebration. He was wounded while fighting against Asidates.

References

Sources

Ancient Greek generals
Ancient Arcadian athletes
Ancient Olympic competitors
5th-century BC Greek people
Military personnel of the Achaemenid Empire